'Busa del Pomar'  is an ancient silver mine located in the north of Italy, just north east Trento.

It is one of the major mines (locally called canope) that are part of the old Monte Calisio silver-mining complex.

Position and structure 

The mine has three entrances: the lower entrance and the main entrance are connected and continue with a remarkable development of tunnels which are often unstable and passable with difficulty. The third entrance, unlike the previous ones, does not continue in depth but stops almost immediately.

Geology and extracted material 

The deposit is of sedimentary origin and in particular is part of the last layer of limestone of Bellerophon Formation.

The mined ore consisted of galena containing significantly high percentage of silver.

Inside the mine are still observable small strands of barite.

References 
  Gruppo Grotte Gardolo, Esplorazione della ex miniera Busa del Pomar, "Natura Alpina", 25 (1974), n. 2, pp. 118–126

Silver mines in Italy